Wilson Phillips is the debut album by American vocal group Wilson Phillips, released in 1990 by SBK Records.

The album was enormously successful in the U.S. where it peaked at #2 on the LP chart for ten weeks starting August 4, 1990. Overall, the album spent 125 weeks on the charts, including one year in the top 10. The album and its singles earned the group four Grammy Award nominations including Album of the Year, Song of the Year and Best New Artist.

The album has sold five million copies in the United States and over eight million worldwide.

Five singles were released from the album, with "Hold On", "Release Me" and "You're in Love" all hitting number one on the US Billboard Hot 100 singles chart. "Impulsive" reached number four, and the fifth single "The Dream Is Still Alive" peaked at number 12.

Track listing

Personnel 

Wilson Phillips
 Chynna Phillips – lead vocals (1, 2, 5–7, 9, 10), backing vocals 
 Carnie Wilson – lead vocals (4, 6, 9, 10), backing vocals 
 Wendy Wilson – lead vocals (3, 8), backing vocals

Musicians
 Glen Ballard – keyboards (1, 2, 4–10), rhythm arrangements (1, 2, 4–10)
 Randy Kerber – keyboards (1, 2, 4–10)
 Clif Magness – keyboards (3), rhythm guitar (3), arrangements (3)
 Bill Payne – organ (3, 10)
 Michael Landau – guitars (1, 2, 4–6, 8–10)
 Joe Walsh – additional rhythm guitar (1, 7), rhythm guitar (3), slide guitar solo (3)
 Steve Lukather – rhythm guitar (7), guitar solo (7, 9)
 Basil Fung – rhythm guitar  (10)
 Jimmy Johnson – bass (1–4, 6–9)
 Abraham Laboriel – bass (5)
  Neil Stubenhaus – bass (10)
 John Robinson – drums
 Paulinho da Costa – percussion 
 Vocals arranged by Glen Ballard and Wilson Phillips

Production 
 Executive producer – Charles Koppelman
 Produced by Glen Ballard
 Recorded and mixed by Francis Buckley
 Additional recording – Glen Ballard, Tom Biener, Francis Buckley, Julie Last, Clif Magness, Gabriel Moffat and Rail Jon Rogut
 Second engineers – Dan Bosworth, Rick Butz, Daryll Dobson and Bill Malina
 Mixed at Garden Rake Studio (Sherman Oaks, California)
 Mastered by Bernie Grundman at Bernie Grundman Mastering (Hollywood)
 Design – Mark Larson
 Cover photography – Timothy White
 Inside photography – Alberto Tallot

Charts

Weekly charts

Year-end charts

Decade-end charts

All-time charts

Certifications

References

1990 debut albums
Albums produced by Glen Ballard
Wilson Phillips albums